Shaibah Air Base (formerly Wahda Air Base before 2003) is an Iraqi Air Force airfield in the Basrah Governorate of Iraq.

History

Royal Air Force use

It was established by the Royal Air Force in 1920 as RAF Station Shaibah, a small and primitive airfield in the desert with a harsh hot and humid climate. A 1930 treaty guaranteed British use till the mid-50s.  The resident squadron was No. 84 Squadron RAF until 1940 when No. 244 Squadron RAF took over.  It expanded during the Second World War. No 244 Sqn was involved in the Rashid Ali rebellion in 1941. Nos 37 and 70 Squadrons (Wellingtons) operated from Shaibah in support of RAF Habbaniya. On 24 April that year, 400 men of the King's Own Royal Regiment were "flown by No.31 Squadron [from India via] Shaibah to RAF Habbaniya to reinforce the armoured cars of No.1 RAF Armoured Car Company." RAF Shaibah was under the control of the RAF's Air Headquarters Iraq (see AHQ Iraq and Persia).  At this time several units were located at Shaibah.  They included:
No. 115 Maintenance Unit RAF (October 1942 - March 1945)
No. 119 Maintenance Unit RAF (October 1942 - July 1945)
No. 8 Supply and Transport Column

No. 5153 Squadron of the Airfield Construction Branch RAF was engaged in building works at Shaibah during the war.

Squadron Leader Kenneth Hubbard was Station Commander of RAF Shaibah in 1951-53 when the station was involved in the evacuation of the British personnel from Abadan in Persia/Iran. He received the Order of the British Empire in 1953.

Early Iraqi Air Force use (1956 - 1990)

On 1 March 1956 it was handed over to the Iraqi Air Force, and it then became an Iraqi Air Force airfield. After that it was renamed to 'Al-Wahda' or Wahda Air Base.

The airfield was bombed by a flight of four Mk.82-equipped McDonnell Douglas F-4 Phantom IIs as part of the Operation Revenge launched by Iranian Air Force two hours after the Iraqi invasion of Iran in 1980. According to Iranian sources, the Mikoyan-Gurevich MiG-25s and some Mikoyan-Gurevich MiG-23 were stationed in this airbase. The airbase was again bombed in the large-scale Operation Kaman 99 on the second day of the war.

Early on May 17, 1987, a modified Iraqi Air Force Dassault Falcon 50 of No. 81 Squadron was redeployed from Saddam Air Base to Wahda. This aircraft, nicknamed "Susanna" by the Iraqis was then loaded with two AM.39 Exocet cruise missiles for its first test/combat flight. Just after dark, the order "Let the bird fly" was given, signalling Susanna to take off and conduct a sortie over the Persian Gulf as part of the Tanker War. The Falcon 50 fired both of its missiles at unknown ship that it detected on radar and returned to Wahda. This ship turned out to be the   leading to the USS Stark Incident.

1991 Gulf War and abandonment 
The aircraft encountered heavier anti-aircraft artillery (AAA) defences than the other Intruder formation from Midway attacking Ahmad al-Jaber Airfield. As a result of the AAA at Wahda, the Midway pilots decided not to attack from low level in the future.

On the evening of 17 January, four RAF Tornados attacked Wahda with JP233 anti-runway dispensers. Just after the attack, ZA392, a GR.1 Tornado from No. 617 Sq, crewed by Commander Nigel Eldson and Flight Lieutenant Max Collier, impacted the ground with no survivors.

On 23 January at 10:00AM, Midway launched aircraft again to attack Wahda. This strike however included both Intruders and F/A-18A Hornets. The strike force encountered light AAA with the aircraft bombing the hangars and ammunition storage facilities on the base.

On 31 January, another RAF attack took place, this time with the US Navy. Between 08:35 and 08:40M local time (17:35Z–17:40Z), RAF Tornados attacked the hangars, despite the bombs on the lead aircraft failing to be dropped. The USN strike package included six A-6E Intruders, an EA-6B Prowler, an A-6E SWIP Intruder from VA-145 equipped with AGM-88 HARMs and four F-14 Tomcats.

It was abandoned after Operation Desert Storm.

2003 US-led invasion of Iraq 

It was captured by Coalition forces during the Iraq War of 2003 and it became the site of a British Military Hospital and the Shaibah Logistics Base (SLB), but the original RAF buildings remain. While the SLB was in operation it was home to British, Dutch, Czech, Danish and Norwegian forces.

The following British units were posted here at some point under Operation Telic:
29 Armoured Engineer Squadron, 35 Engineer Regiment attached to 28 Engineer Regiment constructing a 1,500 man ECI camp.
14 Independent Topographic Squadron, Royal Engineers
150 Transport Regiment RLC(V) personnel on attachment to 1 (GS) Regt RLC during Op Telic 1
160 Transport Regiment (V) RLC on attachment to 2 (Close Support) Battalion REME, from 28 February 2003 until 19 August 2003.
Tyne Tees Regiment - in turn, platoon Light Infantry and Royal Regiment of Fusiliers, then Green Howards and East of England Regiment (Royal Anglian, under OPCON Tyne Tees).July 2003-Jan 2004 Telic 2 and 3. 
East of England Regiment (Volunteers) (EER(V)) during Operation Telic 1, 2 and 6 maintaining the security of the base.
105th Regiment Royal Artillery attached to 19th Regiment Royal Artillery during Op Telic 5 as 13 Headquarters (HQ) Battery.
200 Battery, Royal Artillery between May 2004 and February 2005.
210 Battery, Royal Artillery (V) providing force protection during Telic 4.
220 Battery, 104th Regiment, Royal Artillery Telic 4 between April 2004 and December 2004  providing force protection until December 2004 when the RDG took over.
269 Battery, Royal Artillery.
8 Tpt Regiment (8LSR) between May 2004 and November 2004 consisting of 3 Tank Transporter Squadron, 5 GT Squadron & 13 GT Squadron (including a Troop and individual augmentees from the Scottish Transport Regiment).
A detachment 9 Supply Regiment from March 2003 until unknown.
84 Medical Supply Squadron, RAMC between August 2003 and unknown.
22 Field Hospital.
207 (Manchester) Field Hospital (Volunteers) providing the lead unit for the field hospital between April 2004 and August 2004.
A Company, 1st Battalion The Royal Irish Regiment.
202 (Midlands) Field Hospital (Volunteers) between May 2003 and July 2003
Royal Army Veterinary Corps.
In 2007 the SLB was handed over to the Iraqi Army.

34 field hospital, op telic 1 - 34 Field Hospital was made up of regular troops from their base in Strensall just outside York and members for volunteer reserve units from all over the country. A small 25-bed hospital was sent across the Kuwait-Iraq border in the early days of the war. On arrival at Shaibah, the hospital was set up and ready to take casualties within six and a half hours. Everything that you would expect in a modern hospital was present with an Emergency Department, X-ray, Labs, Surgical Theatres x 2, ITU and a hospital ward.

In effect, the hospital was based on the front line of the British area of responsibility and was the furthest forward medical unit in recent history. Casualties would often miss out the regimental aid posts and dressing stations and go straight to the hospital. Staff at the hospital worked 12-hour shifts without days off until more staff began to arrive around a month later. The 25-bed unit kept working despite some nearby mortar fire, while elements of a bigger hospital were bought in and a 200-bed hospital was eventually built and staff moved over and supplemented.

The hospital took over 3500 casualties through the front door of which more than 350 were major trauma cases and the hospital took around 70 paediatric trauma cases. Injuries included blunt trauma, gunshot wounds, shrapnel injuries and severe burns.It was also the location of the BFBS Radio studios for the duration of the operation.

Current use

The base is currently used by the Iraqi military as a small base.

See also

 Operation Telic order of battle
 List of United Kingdom Military installations used during Operation Telic
List of United States Military installations in Iraq

References

Citations

Bibliography

External links
  RAF Shaibah, Iraq.

Notes
A. A-6E Intruders: 1976-1996 states that only the SWIP Intruder could fire the HARM, since the strike took place close to the Persian Gulf, it most likely would've been from VA-145 onboard the USS Ranger.

Iraqi Air Force bases
1920 establishments in Iraq